Hygroplasta chunshengi is a moth in the family Lecithoceridae. It was described by Pathania and Rose in 2004. It is found in India (Himachal Pradesh, Dehradun).

References

Moths described in 2004
Hygroplasta